William Chalmers (24 July 1907 – 1980) was an association football player and manager who is most well known for managing Italian side Juventus during the 1948–49 season; he is the one of two Scottish managers in the club's history.

Biography
Born in Bellshill, Scotland, as a player Chalmers appeared for various clubs as a forward. After starting out in Glasgow with Queen's Park then Rangers (where he won the 1924–25 Scottish Division One title in his first season with the club but then fell out of favour), he was transferred to Newcastle United in March 1928 for £2,500.

At Newcastle he played alongside club legend Hughie Gallacher, who was also born in Bellshill. Chalmers scored against Leicester City on his debut, then in his second game he scored twice against Burnley which made him become popular quickly with the Toon fans.

After his retirement from playing, Chalmers managed Ebbw Vale, Juventus and coached at former club Bury.

References 

1907 births
Juventus F.C. managers
Footballers from Bellshill
Scottish football managers
Scottish expatriate football managers
Scottish footballers
Queen's Park F.C. players
Rangers F.C. players
Newcastle United F.C. players
Grimsby Town F.C. players
Notts County F.C. players
Scottish expatriate sportspeople in Italy
English Football League players
Scottish Football League players
Bury F.C. players
Aldershot F.C. players
Bellshill Athletic F.C. players
Scottish Junior Football Association players
Association football inside forwards
Serie A managers
Bury F.C. non-playing staff
1980 deaths
Ebbw Vale F.C. managers